Catherine and Gerard Mahon were a husband and wife who lived in Twinbrook, Belfast. Gerard, aged twenty-eight, was a mechanic; Catherine, was twenty-seven. They were killed by the Provisional Irish Republican Army (IRA) on 8 September 1985, the IRA alleging they were informers. However at least two of those responsible for their deaths were later uncovered as British agents within the IRA's Internal Security Unit, leaving the actual status of the Mahons as informers open to doubt.

Background
The Mahons were neighbours of estate agent Joseph Fenton, a supplier of 'safe houses' for the IRA, but also a British agent. 
When a number of IRA missions were compromised, Fenton is believed to have directed a member of the Internal Security Unit, Freddie Scappaticci, and three other men, to the Mahons. Abducted in August, interrogated and beaten for prolonged periods, the Mahons eventually confessed that their flat was bugged by the Royal Ulster Constabulary, who are alleged to have paid the couple for information, another version is that the Mahons had agreed to inform on the IRA if the RUC overlooked a number of outstanding fines and charges they were facing. One of the weapons hidden with the Mahon's as a safe house was found by the IRA to have been fitted with a surveillance device. The IRA took the couple to Norglen Crescent in Turf Lodge and shot them. It is thought Catherine Mahon was shot in the back while trying to escape. Gerard was shot in the face and then the back of the head while his wife was forced to watch. She then tried to run away and was cut down by a burst of machine gun fire.

Deaths
Those who found their bodies said at the time:

We heard two bursts of gunfire and then a car was driven away at high speed. We went out and discovered the girl. We thought she was dead. We tried first aid but the side of her head was blown away. A young lad came up to us saying there was a man lying in the entry a bit further up and still alive. We got to him and he was badly wounded. He was struggling to breath and choking on his own blood. He had been hit in the side of the head and the face. Whatever is behind it all, it's ridiculous. Those responsible are animals. Nothing justifies murder. They had both been tied by their wrists – but they must have broken free by struggling when they realised what was going to happen.

Dr Joe Hendron of the Social Democratic and Labour Party released a statement, remarking:

This slaughter has few equals in barbarity and it proves the Provo idea of justice is warped. It makes us all sick.

See also
 Internal Security Unit
 Stakeknife
 Freddie Scappaticci
 Eamon Collins
 Murder of Thomas Oliver
 Murder of Jean McConville
 Peter Wilson (Disappeared)
 Thomas Niedermayer
 Joseph Fenton

References

External links
Cain.ulst.ac.uk
Nuzhound.com
Thefreelibrary.com
Nuzhound.com
Belfastelegraph.co.uk
Independent.ie
Thebrokenelbow.com
Independent.ie

1985 deaths
1985 in Northern Ireland
Deaths by person in Northern Ireland
Married couples
The Troubles in Belfast
People murdered in Belfast
20th century in Belfast
1980s murders in Northern Ireland
1985 murders in the United Kingdom